The Movement of Young Intellectuals (MYI) is a defunct Angolan nationalist and cultural organization. Viriato da Cruz and others formed the MYI in 1948. The MYI sent a letter to the United Nations calling for Angola to be given protectorate status under United Nations supervision.

References

Angolan nationalism
Defunct political parties in Angola
Political parties established in 1948
1948 establishments in Angola
Political parties with year of disestablishment missing